The 2014 Hirakud boat disaster was an accident that occurred on 9 February 2014 in the reservoir of the Hirakud Dam in the Indian state of Odisha. The incident occurred  when a boat carrying about 115 passengers on board capsized in the reservoir. The disaster killed 31 people.

Accident
The accident occurred near the Pitapali area inside the reservoir at around 4:30 PM when a large group of picnickers were returning in an overcrowded motor boat.  As per eyewitnesses, the motorboat became snagged, water overflowed the gunwale, and it capsized. The passengers tried to bale out the water unsuccessfully. Many of the passengers also jumped off the boat in panic. It was later noted the boat did not have basic safety measures.

Rescue
Firefighters and units of the ODRAF were deployed for rescue operations. A six-member scuba diving rescue team also aided in rescue operations.

References

2014 disasters in India
Transport disasters in India
Sambalpur district
2010s in Odisha
Maritime incidents in India
Deaths due to shipwreck
Accidental deaths in India
February 2014 events in India
Disasters in Odisha